Drug overdose is the ingestion or application of a medication or other substance in a quantity greater than that recommended.

Overdose may also refer to:

Music
 Overdose (album), by Pizzicato Five, 1994
 The Overdose, an album by 11/5, 1999
 Overdose (EP), by Exo-K and Exo-M (which was the two subunits of Exo), 2014
 "Overdose" (Exo song), the title song
 "Overdose" (Ciara song), 2013
 "Overdose," a song by AC/DC from Let There Be Rock, 1977
 "Overdose", a song by Agnez Mo, 2018
 "Overdose", a song by Alessia Cara from Know-It-All, 2015
 "Overdose", a song by Future from The Wizrd, 2019
 "Overdose," a song by Hiroomi Tosaka, 2019
 "Overdose", a song by Jason Derulo from Future History, 2011
 "Overdose," a song by Little Daylight, 2013
 "Overdose", a song by Nav from Good Intentions, 2020
 "Overdose", a song by Status Quo from In the Army Now, 1986
 "Overdose", a song by Tomcraft, 2001
 "Overdose", a song by YoungBoy Never Broke Again from Until Death Call My Name, 2018

Other uses
 Overdose (horse) (2005–2015), a Hungarian Thoroughbred racehorse

See also
 Dose (disambiguation)